Escaut may refer to:

 Scheldt River, Escaut in French
 , a number of ships with this name
 Escaut (department), the former French département

See also
 Manon Lescaut (disambiguation)